The Twenty-First Wisconsin Legislature convened from  to  in regular session.

Senators representing even-numbered districts were newly elected for this session and were serving the first year of a two-year term. Assembly members were elected to a one-year term. Assembly members and even-numbered senators were elected in the general election of November 5, 1867. Senators representing odd-numbered districts were serving the second year of their two-year term, having been elected in the general election held on November 6, 1866.

Major events
 February 24, 1868: The United States House of Representatives voted to impeach U.S. President Andrew Johnson for violating the Tenure of Office Act.
 April 29, 1868: General William Tecumseh Sherman brokered the Treaty of Fort Laramie between the United States and the Plains Indians.
 May 26, 1868: In the United States Senate, the impeachment trial of U.S. President Andrew Johnson ended with a verdict of "not guilty".
 July 9, 1868: Fourteenth Amendment to the United States Constitution was ratified by the required three-fourths of U.S. states.
 July 27, 1868: The U.S. Expatriation Act of 1868 was enacted.
 August 11, 1868: U.S. Representative Thaddeus Stevens, a leader of the Radical Republican faction, died at Washington, D.C.
 October 10, 1868: An uprising in Cuba initiated Ten Years' War for Cuban independence from the Spanish Empire.
 October 28, 1868: Thomas Edison applied for his first patent, the electric vote recorder.
 November 3, 1868: Ulysses S. Grant elected 18th President of the United States.
 December 25, 1868: U.S. President Andrew Johnson granted an unconditional pardon to all American Civil War rebels.

Major legislation
 January 22, 1868: Joint Resolution declaring it to be the duty of the general government to protect American citizens in the enjoyment of all their rights as such while sojourning in foreign countries, 1868 Joint Resolution 1, endorsing the proposed federal Expatriation Act of 1868.
 February 6, 1868: An Act to punish frauds upon insurance companies, 1868 Act 14.
 February 19, 1868: An Act to abolish the office of bank comptroller, and transfer his duties to the state treasurer, 1868 Act 28.
 February 22, 1868: Joint Resolution defining the duty of the nation towards its native and adopted citizens, 1868 Joint Resolution 8, also relating to the proposed federal Expatriation Act of 1868.
 February 29, 1868: An Act to legalize dissections, 1868 Act 53.
 March 4, 1868: An Act to provide for the completion of the state capitol, 1868 Act 93.
 March 5, 1868: An Act to accept a grant of lands made to the state of Wisconsin by act of congress, to aid in the construction of the Sturgeon Bay and Lake Michigan ship canal and harbor, in the county of Door, to connect the waters of Green Bay with Lake Michigan, and to provide for the construction of the same, 1868 Act 105.
 March 6, 1868: Joint Resolution instructing senators and representatives in congress to preserve the equilibrium between the coordinate branches of government, 1868 Joint Resolution 23.
 March 6, 1868: An Act to authorize the state treasurer to close up the circulation of certain banks, and for other purposes, 1868 Act 144.
 March 6, 1868: An Act to transfer the war fund to the general fund and discontinue the war fund, 1868 Act 148.
 March 6, 1868: An Act to provide for establishing town libraries in this state, 1868 Act 174.

Party summary

Senate summary

Assembly summary

Sessions
 1st Regular session: January 8, 1868March 6, 1868

Leaders

Senate leadership
 President of the Senate: Wyman Spooner (R)
 President pro tempore: Newton Littlejohn (R)

Assembly leadership
 Speaker of the Assembly: Alexander M. Thomson (R)

Members

Members of the Senate
Members of the Wisconsin Senate for the Twenty-First Wisconsin Legislature:

Members of the Assembly
Members of the Assembly for the Twenty-First Wisconsin Legislature:

Employees

Senate employees
 Chief Clerk: L. B. Hills
 Assistant Clerk: John S. Wilson
 Bookkeeper: A. W. Wilson
 Engrossing Clerk: W. L. Abbott
 Engrossing Clerk: Joseph Copp
 Transcribing Clerk: David Schreiner
 Sergeant-at-Arms: W. H. Hamilton
 Assistant Sergeant-at-Arms: S. M. Bond
 Sergeant-at-Arms' Porter: Thomas Goss
 Postmaster: Frank Leland
 Assistant Postmaster: J. S. Cavert
 Doorkeeper: Franklin Kelly
 Assistant Doorkeeper: W. G. McEwen
 Assistant Doorkeeper: Walter Cook
 Assistant Doorkeeper: Henry Taylor
 Assistant Doorkeeper: Thornton Thompson
 Fireman: Francis Downs
 Messengers:
 Robert B. McCord
 William Keyes
 Charlton Turner

Assembly employees
 Chief Clerk: Ephraim W. Young
 Assistant Clerk: William M. Newcomb
 Bookkeeper: O. A. Southmayd
 Engrossing Clerk: Fred Dennett
 Enrolling Clerk: William A. Prentiss Jr.
 Transcribing Clerk: William H. Holt
 Sergeant-at-Arms: Charles L. Harris
 Assistant Sergeant-at-Arms: Alex Stevens
 Postmaster: Luther Poland
 Assistant Postmaster: D. B. Crandall
 Doorkeepers: 
 Henry Collins
 Frank Fletcher
 Thomas Healy
 Firemen:
 Nahum Bangs
 John Flood
 Porter: Edwin Glenn
 Speaker's Messenger: Frank Thompson
 Chief Clerk's Messenger: John J. Norton
 Messengers:
 Thomas A. Robbins
 T. W. Sutliff
 William H. Denison
 Charlie J. Johnson
 James Burke
 C. E. Conger

References

External links

1868 in Wisconsin
Wisconsin
Wisconsin legislative sessions